Zack & Geebah were a Liberian musical duo known for their Afro-disco style. Composed of Zack Roberts and Geebah Swaray, the duo were previous members of the band Liberian Dreams. They gained popularity in the mid-1980s, and reportedly sold more than 200,000 copies of their music. They were known for the hit songs "Keep on Trying" and "Sweet Liberia". Although their career were short lived, the duo managed to release two mini albums and a single. Their album For the Love of Money comprises six tracks, and is a blend of boogie, disco, West African melodies, and reggae riddims.

History
Zack & Geebah were composed of singer and drummer Zack Roberts and musician Geebah Swaray. The duo were members of Liberian Dreams, a band known for their hit song "OAU Welcome to Liberia". They decided to record their own music following the band's disbandment, and found work as session musicians in Nigeria. They gained popularity in Liberia in the mid-1980s, and reportedly sold more than 200,000 copies of their music. The duo were known for the hit songs "Keep on Trying" and "Sweet Liberia"; the latter track has been described as a "patriotic ballad". Although their career was short-lived, the duo managed to release two mini albums and a single. Zack & Geebah's album For the Love of Money was reissued by British record label Barely Breaking Even in 2019, as part of its Tabansi Gold reissue project. The album comprises six tracks and is a blend of boogie, disco, West African melodies, and reggae riddims. It was supported by the single "No Peace No Love". Zack & Geebah performed during the re-opening of the Apollo Theatre in Harlem, New York. In 1989, they disbanded prior to the start of the First Liberian Civil War. The split was due to Zack's desire to open a studio and pursue a solo career. In an interview with a local media outlet, Zack said that Geebah never wanted the group to split. 

In September 2019, Zack threatened a court injunction against the current First Lady of Liberia, Clar Weah. He accused her and organizations such as USAID, Fauna & Flora International, Partners in Development, and the Forestry Development Authority of using "Sweet Liberia" and "Keep on Trying" in promotional jingles without seeking permission.

Albums
For the Love of Money

See also
List of Liberian musicians

References

Disco groups
Liberian reggae musical groups
Boogie musicians
Musical groups established in the 1980s